Ganymed was an Austrian/German space disco band founded in 1977.

Career
In 1978, they released their biggest hit, “It Takes Me Higher”, which hit #5 on the Austrian charts for four weeks and also hit #23 on the German charts. That same year, they released their debut album Takes You Higher, which ranked at #16 for 12 weeks and also spawned another single, “Saturn”.

1979 saw the release of their second album, Future World. The album’s title track was released as a B-side to “Dancing in a Disco”. Afterwards, they released their final album, Dimension No. 3, plus a non-album single, “Money Is Addiction (Of This Crazy World)” in 1980.
At their last concert in 1981, Falco played bass for the group. Ganymed officially broke up in 1983.

Members
Gerry Edmond (real name Edmund Gerhard Czerwenka; pseudonym in the group: "Kroonk") – lead vocals, guitar, keyboards, synth programming
Yvonne Dory (real name Doris Ellen Czerwenka; pseudonym in the group: "Pulsaria") – vocals
Rudolf Mille (pseudonym in the group: "Vendd") – keyboards
Gerhard Messinger-Neuwirth (pseudonym in the group: "Schnitzel") – bass, keyboards
Ernst Hefter (pseudonym in the group: "Cak") – drums, percussion, drum programming
Daniele Prencipe (pseudonym in the group: "Suk"; only appeared on "Takes You Higher") – keyboards

Discography

Albums
Takes You Higher (1978)
Future World (1979)
Dimension No. 3 (1980)

Singles
"It Takes Me Higher" (1978)
"Saturn/Music Drives Me Crazy" (1978)
"Dancing in a Disco" (1979)
"Money Is Addiction (Of This Crazy World)" (1980)
"Bring Your Love To Me" (1980)

In popular culture
"It Takes Me Higher" was used as the theme song for the Italian version of the Japanese anime Gaiking.

External links
Discography
Ernst Hefter's page dedicated to his time in Ganymed  
History 
Austrian charts

Austrian electronic music groups
Eurodisco groups
German electronic music groups
Musical groups established in 1977
1977 establishments in Austria